In complex analysis, a branch of mathematics, the Schwarz integral formula, named after Hermann Schwarz, allows one to recover a holomorphic function, up to an imaginary constant, from the boundary values of its real part.

Unit disc
Let f be a function holomorphic on the closed unit disc {z ∈ C | |z| ≤ 1}. Then

for all |z| < 1.

Upper half-plane
Let f be a function holomorphic on the closed upper half-plane {z ∈ C | Im(z) ≥ 0} such that, for some α > 0, |zα f(z)| is bounded on the closed upper half-plane. Then

for all Im(z) > 0.

Note that, as compared to the version on the unit disc, this formula does not have an arbitrary constant added to the integral; this is because the additional decay condition makes the conditions for this formula more stringent.

Corollary of Poisson integral formula 

The formula follows from Poisson integral formula applied to u:

By means of conformal maps, the formula can be generalized to any simply connected open set.

Notes and references 

 Ahlfors, Lars V. (1979), Complex Analysis, Third Edition, McGraw-Hill, 
 Remmert, Reinhold (1990), Theory of Complex Functions, Second Edition, Springer, 
 Saff, E. B., and A. D. Snider (1993), Fundamentals of Complex Analysis for Mathematics, Science, and Engineering, Second Edition, Prentice Hall, 

Theorems in complex analysis